Harry Butsko (Ukrainian: Гері Буцько) (born February 2, 1941) is a former American football linebacker in the National Football League for the Washington Redskins.  He played college football at the University of Maryland and was drafted in the 15th round of the 1963 NFL Draft.  Butsko was also selected in the 27th round of the 1963 AFL Draft by the San Diego Chargers.

References

1941 births
Living people
American football linebackers
Edmonton Elks players
Maryland Terrapins football players
People from Schuylkill County, Pennsylvania
Washington Redskins players
Players of American football from Pennsylvania